Cycle World is a motorcycling magazine in the United States. It was founded in 1962 by Joe Parkhurst, who was inducted to the Motorcycle Hall of Fame as "the person responsible for bringing a new era of objective journalism" to the US.  Cycle World was the largest motorcycling magazine in the world. The magazine is headquartered in Irvine, California. Regular contributors include Peter Egan and Nick Ienatsch. Previous or occasional contributors have included gonzo journalist and author Hunter S. Thompson, journalist and correspondent Henry N. Manney III, and professional riding coach Ken Hill.

Parkhurst sold Cycle World to CBS in 1971. CBS executive Peter G. Diamandis and his associates bought CBS Magazines from CBS in 1987, forming Diamandis Communications, which was acquired by Hachette Magazines the following year, 1988. In 2011, Hachette sold the magazine to Hearst Corporation, which in turn sold Cycle World to Bonnier Corporation the same year. Bonnier also owned Sport Rider, a magazine that had "cover[ed] the sport bike market in the United States"; Bonnier shut it down in 2017 as part of a larger restructuring.

References

External links 
 

Motorcycle magazines published in the United States
Monthly magazines published in the United States
Defunct magazines published in the United States
Magazines established in 1962
Magazines established in 2017
Magazines published in California
Bonnier Group
Hearst Communications publications
1987 mergers and acquisitions
2011 mergers and acquisitions